Obermaat  is a military rank of the Bundeswehr and earlier other German-speaking armed forces.

Bundeswehr 
 Obermaat  (OMaat or in lists OMT) is a rank of the German Navy. It belongs to the particular rank group NCO's without portepee.

According to the salary class it is equivalent to the Stabsunteroffizier of Heer or Luftwaffe. It is grouped as OR5 in NATO, equivalent to Petty officer, second class, Sergeant, or Staff Sergeant in Anglophone armed forces.

In navy context NCOs of this rank were formally addressed as Herr/ Frau Obermaat also informally / short Obermaat. The sequence of ranks (top-down approach) in that particular group is as follows:
Unteroffizier ohne Portepee
OR-5a: Obermaat / (Heer/ Luftwaffe) Stabsunteroffizier
OR-5b: Seekadett / Fahnenjunker
OR-5c: Maat / Unteroffizier

The abbreviation "OR" stands for "Other Ranks / fr: sous-officiers et militaires du rang / ru:другие ранги, кроме офицеров"!

Obermaat Nazi-Kriegsmarine until 1945

See also 
 Ranks of the German Bundeswehr
 Rank insignia of the German Bundeswehr
 Ranks and insignia of NATO navies enlisted

Naval ranks of Germany